This is a list of flag bearers who have represented Ireland at the Olympics.  Flag bearers carry the national flag of their country at the opening ceremony of the Olympic Games.  Men and women from across the country and from a variety of sports have carried the flag at both the Summer Olympic Games and the Winter Olympic Games.

Firsts
Athletes from Ireland competed alongside Great Britain for the first Olympic Games, entering their own team for the first time in 1924.  Many Irish Americans competed for the United States, achieving significant success particularly in athletics.  Pat McDonald, who had moved to the United States at a young age, won the shot put at the 1912 Games and was chosen to carry the U.S. flag at the opening ceremony of the 1920 Games in Antwerp, Belgium.

John O'Grady was the first athlete to bear the Irish tricolour in 1924.  Ireland did not compete in the Winter Olympics until 1992, with Pat McDonagh, a former Summer Olympic rower turned bobsledder, leading out the team.

Boycotts
The 1980 Summer Olympics boycott, initiated by the United States to protest against the Soviet–Afghan War, saw many countries pull out of the Games and only 16 nations appeared at the opening ceremony. Prime Minister Charles Haughey declared his support for the boycott but the Olympic Council of Ireland still chose to send their team to Moscow. Ken Ryan, manager of the Olympic team, said that they supported the government but wanted to participate in the games "purely from the sporting point of view". At the opening ceremony Ryan was the sole representative of the team and marched under a white flag with bearing the Olympic rings. The Soviet cameramen avoided the protesting marchers and few Soviet commentators mentioned it. Only one comment was recorded: "There is the clumsy plot that you all can see, against the traditions of the Olympic movement."

Other notes
The McGarry sisters, Tamsen and Kirsten, both carried the flag for Ireland.  Tamsen was the elder sister, born in 1982 in Bolton, England, and was selected as the flag bearer for the 2002 Games in Salt Lake City.  It was the only time that she would compete at the Olympics.  Kirsten was chosen for the 2006 Games in Turin.  Both sisters were alpine skiers.

List of flag bearers

List of flag bearers:

See also
Ireland at the Olympics

References

Flag bearers
Ireland
Olympic flag bearers